Stanley Smith Stevens (November 4, 1906 – January 18, 1973) was an American psychologist who founded Harvard's Psycho-Acoustic Laboratory, studying psychoacoustics, and he is credited with the introduction of Stevens's power law. Stevens authored a milestone textbook, the 1400+ page Handbook of Experimental Psychology (1951). He was also one of the founding organizers of the Psychonomic Society.  In 1946 he introduced a theory of levels of measurement widely used by scientists but whose use in some areas of statistics has been criticized. In addition, Stevens played a key role in the development of the use of operational definitions in psychology.

A Review of General Psychology survey, published in 2002, ranked Stevens as the 52nd most cited psychologist of the 20th century. He was a member of the American Academy of Arts and Sciences, the United States National Academy of Sciences, and the American Philosophical Society.

Life
Stevens was born in Ogden, Utah to Stanley and Adeline (Smith) Stevens and educated in Latter-day Saint-affiliated schools in Salt Lake City, Utah. He spent much of his childhood in the polygamous household of his maternal grandfather Orson Smith. At the death of his parents in 1924, he spent the next 3 years on an LDS mission in Switzerland and Belgium.  He attended the University of Utah from 1927 to 1929 and Stanford University for the next two years, graduating with an A.B. in psychology in 1931.

Shortly after arriving in Massachusetts to begin a Ph.D., he left the LDS church. After two years of graduate study, he received his Ph.D. in psychology from Harvard University, where he served under Edwin Boring as assistant in psychology, from 1932 to 1934.

The following year he spent studying physiology under Hallowell Davis at Harvard Medical School, and in 1935 served as a research fellow in physics at Harvard for a year. In 1936, Stevens accepted a position as an instructor in experimental psychology at Harvard University.

He married Maxine Leonard in 1930 and had a son, Peter Smith Stevens, in 1936. He married Geraldine Stone, who had worked in the Psycho-Acoustic Laboratory from its inception, in 1963.

Science of Science discussion group
Stevens played a key role in organising the Science of Science discussion group in Cambridge, Massachusetts, which met on eight occasions from October 1940 to mid-1941. Stevens, who was noted for the clarity of his scientific writing, attracted to the group a number of participants whose aim was the "debabelisation of science". The group was also influenced by the 5th Congress of the Unity of Science, which had been held at Harvard University in September 1939 and featured a number of well-known scientists from different disciplines.

Work
Stevens' experimental and theoretical work lay primarily in the fields of psychophysics and psychoacoustics. One of his most influential contributions was his definition of a measurement scale  defined by four types: Nominal, Ordinal, Interval, and Ratio. (see Level of measurement)

See also
 The Logic of Modern Physics

References

 Nicholson, I. (2000).  "S.S. Stevens".  In Alan E. Kazdin (Ed.), Encyclopedia of Psychology. Washington, DC: American Psychological Association Press. 
 Nicholson, I.  (2005). "From the Book of Mormon to the Operational Definition: The Existential Project of S.S. Stevens". In William Todd. Schultz (Ed.), Handbook of Psychobiography (pp. 285–298). New York: Oxford University Press.

Further reading
 

1906 births
1973 deaths
Former Latter Day Saints
Latter Day Saints from Massachusetts
Latter Day Saints from Utah
American Mormon missionaries in Switzerland
American Mormon missionaries in Belgium
20th-century Mormon missionaries
Scientists from Ogden, Utah
University of Utah alumni
Stanford University alumni
Harvard University alumni
Harvard University faculty
20th-century American psychologists
Members of the American Philosophical Society